Jeannie Robertson (1908 – 13 March 1975) was a Scottish folk singer.

Her most celebrated song is "I'm a Man You Don't Meet Every Day", otherwise known as "Jock Stewart", which was covered by Archie Fisher, The Dubliners, The McCalmans, The Tannahill Weavers and The Pogues. Variants are known from the US in the 1880s and Australia in the 1850s.

Hamish Henderson and Alan Lomax
Robertson was born in Aberdeen, Scotland, and in her early life she sometimes lived at 90 Hilton Road, where a plaque now commemorates her. Like many of the Scottish Travellers from Aberdeen, Glasgow and Ayrshire, she went to Blairgowrie to pick raspberries once a year. Hamish Henderson was born in Blairgowrie and tried to track down the best singers there. In 1953, he followed her reputation to her doorstep in Aberdeen. According to legend Jeannie was reluctant to let him in. She challenged him to tell her the opening line of Child ballad no 163, "The Battle of Harlaw", and he complied. In November of the same year she was staying in the London apartment of Alan Lomax. In preparation for a TV appearance, Jean Ritchie, Margaret Barry and Isla Cameron were also there. They swapped songs with each other, while the tape rolled. It is sometimes stated that she made the first recording of "The Battle of Harlaw" but this is not so. The first recording was made in 1936 by the Bothy Ballad singer Willie Kemp (for the Beltona label) and it may be from this that she learnt the song. Another of the songs she sang was "Andrew Lammie" ("Mill o' Tifty's Annie"), lasting over 13 minutes. At the end she told Alan Lomax about the parts of the story that she had not sung. Many of the 1953 recordings were issued as The Queen Among the Heather in 1975. They later reappeared along with other songs on a CD of the same name.

Performances
The television programme was The Song Hunter, produced by David Attenborough, who later became controller of BBC Two television. In 1958, Hamish Henderson recorded her in Edinburgh. Those recordings were issued as Up the Dee and Doon The Don on the Lismor label. The Traditional Music and Song Association founded the Blairgowrie Festival in 1965, during the fruit picking. The first festival saw Robertson, plus Jimmy MacBeath and other valuable source singers, who learned folk songs without the influence of radios or books. Her 1968 appearance there was issued as part of an anthology on the Topic label. As well as classic ballads, she sang bawdy songs such as "Never Wed an Old Man". Robertson was awarded the MBE in 1968 and died on 13 March 1975.

Related folk musicians
Robertson's daughter Lizzie Higgins issued an album in 1975: Up and Awa' wi' the Laverock. Stanley Robertson, a storyteller, ballad singer and piper from Aberdeen, was Jeannie's nephew. Carmen Higgins, ex-fiddler with the Aberdeen folk band, Rock Salt and Nails, is also closely related to her. Carmen Higgins has played with Old Blind Dogs, recorded a solo CD, and has appeared regularly on television, radio and in the press. Joss Cameron, a folk singer from Edinburgh is related to her, and still performs Jeannie Robertson ballads.

Maggie Stewart (1902-1983), Jeannie Robertson's aunt, was recorded singing many traditional ballads and telling stories which can be heard via the Tobar an Dualchais website.

In the early 1960s, the folk-singer Andy Hunter learned songs and storytelling from Jeannie Robertson and her family while studying French at the University of Aberdeen.

Discography
Lord Donald, Collector JFS 4001
World's Greatest Folk Singer, Prestige (1960) INT 13006
The Cuckoo's Nest and Other Scottish Folk Songs, Prestige INT 13075
Songs of a Scots Tinker Lady, (with Josh Morse) Riverside RLP12-633
Jeannie Robertson, Topic (1959) 10T52
--do.--(without guitar acc.), Topic 12T96
What a Voice, Folktracks TFSA 60-067
The Gypsy Lady, Folktracks TFSA 60-186
Silly John & the Factor, (folk tale & talk) Folktracks TFSA 60-187
Up the Dee and doon the Don, Lismor (1984)

In 2009, "MacCrimmon's Lament" from Jeannie Robertson was included in Topic Records 70-year anniversary CD boxed set Three Score and Ten.

See also
 Scottish Travellers

References

Further reading
 Jeannie Robertson: A Tribute, in Burnett, Ray (ed.), Calgacus 2, Summer 1975, pp. 44 & 45, 
 Kodish, Debra. "Absent Gender, Silent Encounter", The Journal of American Folklore; 100 (1987), 573-578; ; an article about the gender politics of Hamish Henderson's "discovery" of Jeannie Robertson
Pohle, Horst (1987) The Folk Record Source Book; 2nd ed. p. 398 (for discography)

External links
 Scottish Traditional Music - Hall of Fame

1908 births
1975 deaths
Scottish folk singers
20th-century Scottish women singers
Scottish Travellers
Musicians from Aberdeen
Scottish folk-song collectors
20th-century British musicologists
Women folklorists
Topic Records artists
Riverside Records artists